The 1964 Dutch Grand Prix was a Formula One motor race held at Zandvoort on 24 May 1964. It was race 2 of 10 in both the 1964 World Championship of Drivers and the 1964 International Cup for Formula One Manufacturers. The 80-lap race was won by Lotus driver Jim Clark after he started from second position. John Surtees finished second for the Ferrari team and Clark's teammate Peter Arundell came in third.

Classification

Qualifying

Race

Championship standings after the race 

Drivers' Championship standings

Constructors' Championship standings

 Notes: Only the top five positions are included for both sets of standings.

References 

Dutch Grand Prix
Dutch Grand Prix
Grand Prix
Dutch Grand Prix